Marcus Agrippa Postumus (12 BC – AD 14), later named Agrippa Julius Caesar, was a Roman nobleman who was the youngest son of Marcus Vipsanius Agrippa and Julia the Elder, the daughter and only biological child of the Roman Emperor Augustus. Augustus initially considered Postumus as a potential successor, and formally adopted him as his heir, but banished him from Rome in AD 6 on account of his  ("beastly nature"). In effect (though not in law), this action cancelled his adoption, and virtually assured Tiberius' emplacement as Augustus' sole heir. Postumus was ultimately executed by his own guards shortly after Augustus' death in AD 14.

Postumus was a member of the Julio-Claudian dynasty, the first imperial family of the Roman Empire. His maternal grandparents were Augustus and Scribonia, Augustus' second wife. He was also a maternal uncle of Emperor Caligula, who was the son of Postumus' sister Agrippina the Elder, as well as a great-uncle of Nero, the last Julio-Claudian emperor, whose mother Agrippina the Younger was Caligula's sister.

Name
He was initially named "Marcus Agrippa" in honor of his father, who died shortly before his birth, for which reason the surname Postumus was added. After the death of his older brothers, Lucius and Gaius Caesar, Postumus was adopted by his maternal grandfather, Roman Emperor Augustus. A lex curiata ratified his adoption, from which Postumus assumed the filiation Augusti f., meaning "son of Augustus". Postumus was then legally the son of Augustus, as well as his biological grandson. As a consequence, Postumus was adopted into the Julia gens, and he took the name "Julius Caesar" as a result. His name was changed to Agrippa Julius Caesar.

Early life and family

Agrippa Postumus was born in Rome in 12 BC, approximately three months after his father, Marcus Vipsanius Agrippa, died in the summer. He was born into the equestrian , as the son of Marcus Vipsanius Agrippa, one of Augustus' leading generals, and Julia the Elder, the daughter of Augustus and his second wife Scribonia. Postumus was the third son and last child of Agrippa and Julia; his older siblings were Gaius Caesar, Julia the Younger, Lucius Caesar, and Agrippina the Elder. His brothers, Gaius and Lucius, were both adopted by Augustus following the birth of Lucius in 17 BC.

Before his brother Gaius left Rome for Asia, Gaius and Lucius were given the authority to consecrate the Temple of Mars Ultor (1 August 2BC), and they managed the games held to celebrate the Temple's dedication. At these games, according to Cassius Dio, 260 lions were slaughtered in the Circus Maximus, there was gladiatorial combat and a naval battle between the "Persians" and the "Athenians", and 36 crocodiles were slaughtered in the Circus Flaminius.

Adoption
At first, Augustus opted not to adopt Postumus so that Agrippa would have at least one son to carry on his family name. However, the untimely deaths of  Lucius (d. AD 2) and Gaius (d. AD 4) forced Augustus to adopt Postumus, his only remaining biological grandson, and Tiberius, Augustus' eldest stepson from his third wife, Livia on 26 June AD 4 to secure the succession. He agreed to adopt Tiberius on the condition that Tiberius first adopt Germanicus. Following the adoptions of AD 4, in the event of Augustus' death, the title of  would pass first to Tiberius and then from Tiberius to Germanicus.

It was not intended that Postumus receive the emperorship; instead, he was meant to be the heir to Augustus' bloodline. Indeed, Postumus was not given any special schooling or treatment following his adoption. This differed greatly from the honors received by his brothers, who were both conducted into the Forum by Augustus himself to commemorate their adoptions, given the title  ("Leader of the Youth"), and promised the consulship five years in advance, to be held when they reached nineteen.

Exile

In AD 6, an uprising began in the Roman province of Illyricum. Augustus sent Tiberius to crush the revolt with his army, and after a year of delayed results, he sent Germanicus in his capacity as quaestor to assist in bringing the war to a swift end. The reason, Dio says, that Germanicus was chosen over Postumus is because Postumus was of an "illiberal nature".

Postumus was known for being brutish, insolent, stubborn, and potentially violent. He possessed great physical strength and reportedly showed little interest in anything other than fishing. The ancient historian Velleius Paterculus had this to say of the banishment:

The following year, in 7 AD, Augustus had the Senate make Postumus' banishment permanent and had him moved to Planasia (modern Pianosa, Italy), a small island between Italy and Corsica. Augustus bolstered the natural inaccessibility of the rocky island by having an armed guard installed there. The Senate was ordered to never allow his release.

No consensus has emerged as to why Augustus banished Postumus. Tacitus suggests that Augustus' wife Livia had always disliked and shunned Postumus, as he stood in the way of her son Tiberius succeeding to power after Augustus, given that Postumus was a direct biological descendant of Augustus and Tiberius was not. Some modern historians theorise that Postumus may have become involved in a conspiracy against Augustus. Postumus was held under intense security.

Postumus' sister Julia the Younger was banished around the same time (AD 8) and her husband Lucius Aemilius Paullus was executed for allegedly plotting a conspiracy against Augustus. There was later a conspiracy to rescue Julia and Postumus by Lucius Audasius and Asinius Epicadus. Audasius was an accused forger of advanced age and Asinius was half-Illyrian. According to Suetonius, Audasius and Epicadus had planned to take Julia and Postumus by force to the armies. It is unclear what their exact plan was, or even which armies Suetonius was referring to, because the conspiracy was discovered early in its planning, possibly before they had even left Rome.

Death of Augustus

Augustus made no effort to contact Postumus until AD 14. In the summer of that year, Augustus left Rome, never to see the capital again. The main ancient sources of information about this period, Tacitus and Cassius Dio, suggest that Augustus left Rome in the company of only one trusted friend, the senator Paullus Fabius Maximus. The two left for Planasia to pay Augustus' banished grandson a highly controversial visit.

Fabius and then Augustus himself died on their return, without revealing what they had been doing. Tacitus reports their visit to Planasia as a rumor, although Dio reports it as fact. According to the historian Robin Lane Fox, the alleged visit has sometimes been dismissed by modern scholars. However, it has been shown that Augustus and Fabius were absent from Rome in mid-May of AD 14. At this date, Augustus' adopted grandson, Drusus the Younger, was being admitted into the Arval Brethren, and an inscription (ILS, 5026) shows that both Augustus and Fabius voted  to admit him into the priesthood.

There was much gossip over the outcome of their expedition. Tacitus recounts the rumor that Augustus had decided to reverse his decision and make Postumus his successor. In his account, Fabius indiscreetly told his wife what had occurred during the trip, and it cost him his life. Augustus' wife Livia, too, was said to have poisoned her husband in order to prevent Postumus from becoming the successor and thus supplanting her son Tiberius. While modern historians, including Fox, agree that such stories are highly unlikely, there is evidence that Augustus' journey was historical. "It is the last act in Augustus' long marathon of finding and keeping an heir to the new Empire".

Accession of Tiberius
Augustus died on 19 August AD 14. Despite being banished, Postumus had not legally been disinherited, and so could claim a share in Augustus' inheritance. According to Augustus' will, sealed on 3 April AD 13, Tiberius would inherit two-thirds of his estate, and Livia one-third. There is no mention of Postumus in the document.

Execution
At almost the same time as Augustus' death, Postumus was killed by the centurion Gaius Sallustius Crispus, the great-nephew and adopted son of the historian Sallust. When Crispus reported to Tiberius that "his orders have been carried out", Tiberius threatened to bring the matter before the Senate, professing that he had given no such orders. Tiberius denied any involvement, arguing that he had been en route to Illyricum when he was recalled to Rome, and later issued a statement that it was his father who gave the order that Agrippa Postumus not survive him. It is not clear if the killing was carried out before or after Tiberius became emperor.

Post mortem
Two years later, there was an attempt by Postumus' former slave Clemens to impersonate him. Clemens was able to impersonate Postumus because people did not remember what he looked like, although Dio also says there was a resemblance between them. The impersonation was carried out by the same slave who had set out in AD 14 to ship Postumus away and the act was met with considerable success among the plebs.

Historiography
According to the historian Erich S. Gruen, various contemporary sources state that Postumus was a "vulgar young man, brutal and brutish, and of depraved character". The Roman historian Tacitus defended him, but his praise was slight: "[He was] the young, physically tough, indeed brutish, Agrippa Postumus. Though devoid of every good quality, he had been involved in no scandal."

It was common for ancient historians to portray Postumus as dim-witted and brutish. Velleius portrays Postumus as having had a deformed or perverse character, Dio records a propensity to violence ("He had an impetuous temper...") and a devotion to "servile pursuits", while Tacitus and Suetonius both describe him as fierce (""). Contemporaries were reported to have described Postumus as wild (""), while Suetonius is in agreement with Dio's "servile pursuits" depiction. Historian Andrew Pettinger argues that these descriptions of Postumus reveal a moral inadequacy, not a mental disorder.

In fiction
Postumus is depicted in many works of art due to his relationship with the leading family of the early Roman Empire. They include:

I, Claudius (1934), a novel by Robert Graves, presents Postumus in a positive light, as a boyhood friend of the narrator, Claudius. It creates a fictional incident in which Postumus is framed by Livia and her granddaughter Livilla for the attempted rape of Livilla, as a means of all but guaranteeing Tiberius' succession to the emperorship. Postumus is banished to Planasia but escapes execution when Augustus arranges for his impersonation of his freed slave Clemens, who is later executed by Crispus, unwittingly in Postumus' stead. The real Postumus spends time on the run, but is eventually captured and executed by Tiberius.
In The Caesars (1968), a television series by Philip Mackie, Postumus was played by Derek Newark. Here Postumus is sentenced to death by Augustus, who decides to permanently remove his only remaining grandson as an obstacle to the succession of Tiberius.
In I, Claudius (1976), a television series by Jack Pulman based on Graves' novels, Postumus was played by John Castle. This retains the story from the novel of Postumus being framed for the assault on Livilla, and the later visit to Planasia by Augustus, but removes his fictional survival and shifts the events concerning his banishment to after the Battle of the Teutoburg Forest. He is killed by Sejanus on Planasia after Augustus' death.

Ancestry

Notes

References

Sources

Primary sources
 Cassius Dio, Roman History Books 55–57, English translation
 Suetonius, Lives of the Twelve Caesars, Life of Augustus, Latin text with English translation
 Tacitus, Annals I, English translation

Secondary sources

 
 
 
 
 
 
 
 
 
 
 
 
 
 
 
 

Agrippa Postumus, Marcus Vipsanius
Julii Caesares
1st-century BC Romans
1st-century Romans
12 BC births
14 deaths
Ancient Roman exiles
Ancient Roman adoptees
Children of Augustus
Children of Marcus Vipsanius Agrippa
Heirs apparent who never acceded